Raghoji I (Raghoji Bhonsle; ; 1695 – February 1755) or Raghuji the Great of the Bhonsale dynasty, was a Maratha general who took control of the Nagpur Kingdom in east-central India during the reign of Shahu I. His successors ruled the kingdom until 1853.

Origin
The Bhonsale family were originally headmen from Deor or Deur under the forts Chandan Vandan (presently in Koregaon Taluka, District Satara and was under Deshmukhi rights of Bhoite Clan), a village in Satara District. Raghoji's grandfather and his two brothers had fought in the armies of Shivaji Maharaj, and to the most distinguished of them was entrusted a high military command and the collection of chauth (tribute) in Berar.

Rise to power in Nagpur
After Chand Sultan's death in 1739, there were quarrels over the succession, leading to the throne being usurped by Wali Shah, an illegitimate son of Bakht Buland Shah. Chand Sultan's widow queen Ratan Kunwar invoked the aid of the Maratha leader Raghoji Bhonsle of Berar in the interest of her sons Akbar Shah and Burhan Shah. Wali Shah was put to death and the rightful heirs placed on the throne. Raghoji I Bhonsle was sent back to Berar with a plentiful bounty for his aid. The Maratha general judged that Nagpur must be a plentiful and rich country by the magnificence of his reward.

However, dissensions continued between the brothers and once again, the elder brother Burhan Shah requested the aid of Raghoji Bhonsle. Akbar Shah was driven into exile and finally poisoned at Hyderabad. However this time, Raghoji Bhonsle did not have the heart to leave such a plentiful and rich country, with it being within his grasp. He declared himself 'protector' of the Gond king. Thus in 1743, Burhan Shah was practically made a state pensionary, with real power being in the hands of the Maratha ruler. After this event the history of the Gond kingdom of Deogarh is not recorded. A series of Maratha rulers came to power following the fall of the Gonds from the throne of Nagpur, starting with Raghoji Bhonsle.

Reign

Bold and decisive in action, Raghoji was the archetype of a Maratha leader; he saw in the troubles of other states an opening for his own ambition, and did not even require a pretext for invasion. Twice his armies invaded Bengal, and he obtained the cession of Cuttack. Chanda, Chhattisgarh, and Sambalpur were added to his dominions between 1745 and 1755, the year of his death. He was succeeded by Janoji Bhonsle.

Battle of Damalcherry

Dost Ali Khan ordered Chanda Sahib to march against the Raja of Tirusivapuram. There upon the raja invited the assistance of the Maratha Empire.

Soon afterwards took place the Battle of Damalcherry in 1740, which was a major confrontation between the Mughal Empire's Nawab of the Carnatic, Dost Ali Khan and his Maratha opponent Raghoji I Bhonsale. The battle was a victory for the Marathas in which Dost Ali Khan, his son and a number of prominent persons of Arcot were killed and resulted in three years of Maratha rule in the Carnatic.

Expeditions in Bengal

The Expeditions in Bengal was taken by the Maratha Empire after the successful campaign in Carnatic at the Battle of Trichinopolly. The leader of the expedition was Raghoji of Nagpur. Raghoji was able to annex Orissa and parts of Bengal permanently as he successfully exploited the chaotic conditions prevailing in the region  after the death of their Governor Murshid Quli Khan in 1727. Nawab of Bengal ceded territory up to the river Suvarnarekha to the Marathas, and agreeing to pay Rs. 20 lacs as chauth for Bengal (includes both West Bengal and Bangladesh) and 12 lacs for Bihar (including Jharkhand), thus Bengal becoming a tributary to the Marathas.

References

 Hunter, William Wilson, Sir, et al. (1908). Imperial Gazetteer of India 1908-1931; Clarendon Press, Oxford.

People of the Maratha Empire
1755 deaths
Maharajas of Nagpur
Year of birth unknown
18th-century Indian royalty
Indian military leaders